Unidentified Flying Oddball is a 1979 science fiction comedy film. It is based on Mark Twain's 1889 novel A Connecticut Yankee in King Arthur's Court, directed by Russ Mayberry and produced by Walt Disney Productions.  Released in the United Kingdom as The Spaceman and King Arthur, then subsequently re-released in the United States as A Spaceman in King Arthur's Court, the film stars Dennis Dugan as NASA employee Tom Trimble who unintentionally travels back in time with his look-alike android Hermes.

Premise
After Trimble's NASA spacecraft travels faster than the speed of light, it takes him and his android back to King Arthur's Camelot in the year 508 AD. They then use their 20th-century technology to help defeat a plot by the evil Sir Mordred and Merlin to oust King Arthur from his throne.

Cast

Dennis Dugan as Tom Trimble/Hermes
Jim Dale as Sir Mordred
Ron Moody as Merlin
Kenneth More as King Arthur
John Le Mesurier as Sir Gawain
Rodney Bewes as Clarence
Sheila White as Alisande ("Sandy")
Robert Beatty as Senator Milburn
Cyril Shaps as Dr. Zimmerman
Kevin Brennan as Winston
Ewen Solon as Watkins
Pat Roach as Oaf
Reg Lye as Prisoner

Production
The spacecraft featured in this movie was on display at the Blackgang Chine theme park in the Isle of Wight.

Filming
The film was shot on location and at Pinewood Studios London. Shooting locations included Alnwick Castle in Northumberland.

Release
The film had its premiere at the Odeon, St. Martin's Lane, London on July 19, 1979 attended by Princess Margaret.

Reception
Variety wrote, "Pic has some good slapstick touches and offers a generous serving of visual tricks and space hardware, though on a par with Star Wars in that department it ain't." Linda Gross of the Los Angeles Times stated, "The film will provide mildly amusing summer fun for those having their first encounter with castles and kings. However, A Connecticut Yankee in King Arthur's Court, Knights of the Round Table and Camelot all captured the vigor of medieval England with more passion." Carla Hall of The Washington Post wrote: "The plot—obviously derived from 'A Connecticut Yankee in King Arthur's Court'—has the customary quantum of Disney cuteness as the story unravels predictably. But it takes advantage of the situation for some funny lines." Martyn Auty of The Monthly Film Bulletin stated: "Quintessentially Arthurian locations and resplendent colour quality (that owes more to the processing lab than to Northumberland) put this updated version of Mark Twain's A Connecticut Yankee in King Arthur's Court a cut above its predecessors in the current Disney craze for space-visitor yarns."

The film earned theatrical rentals of $4.475 million in the United States and Canada.

References

External links
 

Arthurian films
1979 films
1970s fantasy comedy films
American fantasy adventure films
American science fantasy films
Films about time travel
Android (robot) films
Films about astronauts
Walt Disney Pictures films
Films based on fantasy novels
Films based on A Connecticut Yankee in King Arthur's Court
Films set in the 6th century
American science fiction comedy films
Films shot at Pinewood Studios
1970s science fiction comedy films
Films based on American novels
American fantasy comedy films
Films scored by Ron Goodwin
Films produced by Ron W. Miller
1979 comedy films
Films directed by Russ Mayberry
1970s English-language films
1970s American films